Universal Business School (UBS) is a business school in India with a campus in Karjat, Mumbai. The school was founded by two executives, from Thomson Reuters, and Blue Star and is governed by a board comprising both Indian and non-Indian executives.      
Universal Business School is approved by AICTE to award PGDM programs in India and is accredited by National Board of Accreditation and Association of Indian Universities.

History and formation 
Universal Business School was started in 2009 by a group of executives and academicians. Co-founder, Management Consultant and visiting professor at Jamnalal Bajaj Institute of Management Studies Gurdip Singh Anand, co-founder and co-founder and Thomson Reuters executive Tarun Anand worked together to start the school. First Indu Shahani Former Sheriff of Mumbai and Principal H.R. College of Commerce & Economics joined as the Chief Mentor. Gurdip Anand became the school's first chairman.  UBS became the first Business School to appoint an Oxford University Professor and Former deputy director of Said Business School as its International Dean – Corporate Governance.

The 40 acres of land was acquired in 2009 and the construction commenced in 2010 after converting the land for non-agricultural purposes. The Post Graduate Programme was launched in 2011. UBS received its approval from AICTE, Ministry of HRD, Government of India in 2012 for its PGDM programme. In November 2012, UBS entered into an alliance with Cardiff Metropolitan University, UK for giving BBA and MBA Degree. In 2013 UBS became the first Business School to be approved by AICTE to give an International MBA Degree in India. In 2013, UBS launched its executive education programmes. In 2013, UBS received the award "The Best upcoming B-School in India" by ASSOCHAM and Dr Pallam Raju, Hon’ble Cabinet Minister, Ministry of HRD, Government of India. In 2013, UBS was also termed as "Five Star University" by India Today Magazine. In 2016, UBS entered into an alliance with the University of Economics Varna, for giving Dual Continent MBA Degree in International Business and Economics. In 2017, UBS entered yet another international alliance with the Swiss School of Management and INSEEC Business School for giving a Global MBA Degree. In 2020, UBS entered into an alliance with Northeastern Illinois University, USA for awarding a Global MBA Degree.

Campus 
Spread over 40 acres, the heart of the campus is the academic building, which houses lecture theatres, classrooms, faculty offices, the learning centre (library), cafeteria and a 130-seat UN-styled auditorium. The campus was set up in 2011 and is spread across 40 acres. UBS is called India's 1st Green Business School offering Eco-Friendly MBAs.

Academics 
Universal Business School is accredited by the All India Council of Technical Education (AICTE), a statutory government body which accredits specific graduate and postgraduate programs.by AICTE, Government of India.

See also 
List of MBA schools in India
List of business schools in Asia

References

External links

 UBS Official Website

Business schools in Mumbai